Thomas Younger (10 April 1930 – 13 January 1984) was a Scottish footballer who played as a goalkeeper for Hibernian,  Liverpool, Falkirk, Leeds United, Stoke City and the Scotland national team.

Career
Born in Edinburgh, Scotland, Younger signed for his hometown club Hibernian in 1948. He was part of the successful side of the early 50s, winning two titles in 1950–51 and 1951–52.

Liverpool manager Phil Taylor signed Younger in June 1956 for £9000. He made his debut at Anfield on 18 August 1956 in a league match against Huddersfield Town. Huddersfield spoilt Younger's day by taking both points from a 3–2 win. He kept his first clean-sheet two games later at Gigg Lane as the Reds beat Bury 2–0. Younger immediately took over the No.1 jersey at Anfield and played in 43 of Liverpool's 45 matches in his first season. Younger spent three years at Liverpool, only missing six matches during this time making a total of 127 appearances. In 1959, he was allowed to leave to take on a player/manager role in Scotland.

Younger joined Falkirk as player manager in 1959. A back injury led to his retirement as a player.

After finding out that the injury was not as bad as first diagnosed, he signed for Stoke City in 1960. Younger played ten league games for Stoke towards the end of the 1959–60 season. He endured a difficult time playing in a struggling side at the Victoria Ground. In his ten matches Stoke lost nine of them with Younger conceding 22 goals. He was released at the end of the season.

He played three matches for Welsh league side Rhyl before Leeds United manager Don Revie, who was bringing experienced players to cope with declining fortunes at the club, signed Younger in 1961. He made 42 appearances for Leeds in 13 months before retiring for a second (and final) time in October 1962. In 1961, he played in the Eastern Canada Professional Soccer League with Toronto City.

International career
Younger was capped by Scotland 24 times, in an unbroken sequence spanning three years. He made his debut on 4 May 1955 in a friendly international against Portugal at Hampden Park, Glasgow. The Scots were too strong for their Iberian counterparts, winning the game 3–0 and thus gaining Younger his first clean-sheet at national level. Younger also had the honour of keeping goal for the Scottish side during the 1958 World Cup in Sweden. His appearance at the finals against Paraguay was also his last appearance for the national side.

After playing
After his retirement he stayed on at Leeds as a scout. He then took a coaching role in Canada at Toronto City.

After his stint in Toronto he returned to Hibs as this time as director. Younger became vice president of the Scottish Football Association to Willie Harkness taking over as president after Harkness retired from that in May 1983. Younger held the position until his death eight months later on 13 January 1984, aged 53. He was survived by his wife, Mary, three daughters and a son.

Career statistics

Club
Source:

International
Source:

See also
List of Scotland national football team captains

References

External links
 Player profile at LFChistory.net
 

1930 births
1958 FIFA World Cup players
1984 deaths
Falkirk F.C. managers
Falkirk F.C. players
Hibernian F.C. directors and chairmen
Hibernian F.C. players
Leeds United F.C. players
Liverpool F.C. players
Scotland international footballers
Chairmen and investors of football clubs in Scotland
Scottish Football League players
Scottish football managers
Scottish footballers
Scottish expatriate footballers
Scottish expatriate football managers
Eastern Canada Professional Soccer League players
Expatriate soccer players in Canada
Scottish expatriate sportspeople in Canada
Stoke City F.C. players
Toronto City players
Toronto City managers
English Football League players
Footballers from Edinburgh
Scottish Football League representative players
Scottish Football League managers
Association football goalkeepers
20th-century Scottish businesspeople